Leandro González (born October 14, 1985 in Pigué, Buenos Aires) is an Argentine professional  footballer who plays as a forward for Gimnasia Jujuy. He can play as a second forward or wide on the right or left wing.

Club career

González started his playing career in 2005 with Olimpo de Bahía Blanca, the club were relegated to the Argentine 2nd division in 2006, but they bounced straight back, winning both the Apretura and Cluasura championships in 2006-07. The following season they were relegated again, prompting González to join Racing Club in 2008.

In 2009 González was transferred to Estudiantes, and he scored his first official goal in a Copa Libertadores 5-1 rout of Peruvian side Juan Aurich, 11 February 2010 .

Omonia Nicosia
On 6 July 2017, Cypriot First Division club Omonia Nicosia announced the signing of González. He made his debut on 10 September 2017 against Ethnikos Achna on the 2017-18 season's premier.

Honours
Olimpo
Primera B Nacional (1): 2006–07
Estudiantes
Argentine Primera División (1): 2010 Apertura

References

External links
  
  
 

1985 births
Living people
Argentine footballers
Argentine expatriate footballers
Sportspeople from Buenos Aires Province
Association football forwards
Olimpo footballers
Racing Club de Avellaneda footballers
Estudiantes de La Plata footballers
Club Atlético Colón footballers
Defensa y Justicia footballers
Atlético Tucumán footballers
AC Omonia players
Quilmes Atlético Club footballers
Club Atlético Temperley footballers
Gimnasia y Esgrima de Jujuy footballers
Argentine Primera División players
Primera Nacional players
Cypriot First Division players
Argentine expatriate sportspeople in Cyprus
Expatriate footballers in Cyprus
Footballers at the 2011 Pan American Games
Pan American Games silver medalists for Argentina
Pan American Games medalists in football
Medalists at the 2011 Pan American Games